Kwadwo Poku (born 19 February 1992) is a Ghanaian former professional footballer who played as an attacking midfielder.

Club career

Youth
Poku played in the youth system of his hometown club, Asante Kotoko SC, in Kumasi, Ghana.

Georgia Revolution
In late 2010, Poku moved to the US and joined 4th division side Georgia Revolution ahead of their 2011 season. Playing as a striker in the 2012 and 2013  NPSL seasons Poku was his team's top scorer and in the 2013 season he also contributed a team-high seven assists. In May 2013, he scored a hat-trick in a 4–3 win over Real Colorado Foxes in the first round of the US Open Cup.

Atlanta Silverbacks
Poku moved to the Atlanta Silverbacks of the NASL on January 24, 2014. During his time at the club he made 25 appearances, scoring twice, including a winning goal in the 91st minute against MLS side Real Salt Lake in the fourth round of the US Open Cup. Silverbacks manager and technical director Eric Wynalda described Poku as one of the best players in NASL, adding that he "might be too good for the MLS too".

New York City FC
In January 2015, Poku was signed by MLS expansion side New York City FC after they acquired Poku's MLS rights from Seattle Sounders FC in exchange for a 2017 MLS SuperDraft pick. Poku quickly became a fan favourite at New York City for his eye catching performances, he was named to the MLS 24 under 24 at the end of the 2015 season.

Miami FC
After failing to earn consistent playing time under new coach Patrick Vieira, he was sold to Miami FC of the NASL in late June 2016, for a reported fee of $700,000.

Anzhi Makhachkala
On 17 January 2018, Poku signed for Russian club FC Anzhi Makhachkala until 31 May 2020.

Tampa Bay Rowdies
On 26 June 2018, Poku returned to the United States and signed with USL team Tampa Bay Rowdies. He scored his first goal for the team on 25 August 2018 in a 1–2 against FC Cincinnati.

Europa 
On 27 June 2020, Poku signed for Europa FC of Gibraltar.

International career
During August 2015, Poku showed interest in playing international football for both Ghana and the United States national teams. United States coach Jurgen Klinsmann reportedly approached Poku and asked him to switch nationality following his impressive performance in MLS for New York City FC; however, Poku did not have US citizenship.

On 10 October 2015, Poku received his first call up from Ghana for a friendly against Canada. Poku played 8 minutes after being subbed on in a 1–1 draw.

Poku holds a U.S. green card which also qualifies him as a domestic player for MLS and NASL roster purposes.

Honours
Individual
NYCFC Etihad Player of the month: August 2015

Career statistics

Club

References

External links

Garevolution.com
Atlantasilverbacksfc.com

1992 births
Living people
Ghanaian footballers
Ghanaian expatriate footballers
Ghana international footballers
Association football midfielders
Georgia Revolution FC players
Atlanta Silverbacks players
New York City FC players
Wilmington Hammerheads FC players
Miami FC players
FC Anzhi Makhachkala players
Tampa Bay Rowdies players
Expatriate soccer players in the United States
Expatriate footballers in Russia
North American Soccer League players
Major League Soccer players
USL Championship players
Russian Premier League players
Footballers from Kumasi
Europa F.C. players
Expatriate footballers in Gibraltar
United Premier Soccer League players